Events in world sport through the years 1741 to 1745.

Boxing
Events
 24 April 1741 — Broughton defeated George Stevenson after 35 minutes and in the 4th round of a fight in London. Stevenson's injuries were serious and he died a few days later.
 May 1741 — Upset by Stevenson's death, Broughton retired from the ring. He returned in March 1743; George Taylor reclaimed the title in 1741.
 16 June 1741 — Taylor defeated Prince Boswell at London after 2 hours and 15 minutes in the 4th round.
 1741 — Together with the aristocratic patrons of his boxing academy, Broughton proposed and eventually drafted a set of rules to improve ring safety.
 1743 — Jack Slack (the " Norfolk Butcher") defeated three local opponents and was recognized as the Norfolk county champion.
 10 March 1743 — Broughton opened his amphitheatre on Oxford Street.
 13 March 1743 — Broughton announced his comeback and reclaimed the Championship of England, which George Taylor had held since May 1741.
 13 March 1743 — George Taylor v Sailor Field was scheduled to take place in London but, for an unknown reason, was cancelled.
 16 Aug 1743 — Broughton published his Rules of the Ring (aka Broughton's Rules), in which Rule VII reads: "That no person is to hit his Adversary when he is down, or seize him by the ham, the breeches, or any part below the waist: a man on his knees to be reckoned down".
 1744 — Broughton successfully defended his title three times to 1746 against Chicken Harris, Jack James and Tom Smallwood and all fights were in London.
 1744 — Taylor closed his Amphitheatre and went to work for Jack Broughton at his place for several years. There, he took on all-comers and never lost a fight until 1750.
 24 June 1744 — Slack defeated Daniel Smith in a 20-minute fight in East Anglia.
 12 November 1744 — Slack defeated Daniel Smith at Framlingham in a 45-minute 18th round fight.
 1745 — Slack defeated several opponents in provincial rings.

Cricket
Events
 1741 — emergence of Slindon Cricket Club; its most outstanding player was Richard Newland.
 1743 — first mention in the sources of the great Kent batsman Robert Colchin.
 1744 — first codification of the Laws of Cricket, by the Star and Garter club of Pall Mall in London; these Laws do not say the bowler must roll the ball and there is no mention of prescribed arm action so, in theory, a pitched delivery would have been legal, although pitching was not introduced until the 1760s.
 1744 — the earliest known scorecards were created for two matches this season but they did not come into regular use until 1772.
 1745 to 1748 — single wicket cricket became increasingly popular and was the main form of cricket in England during this decade with lucrative contests taking place at the Artillery Ground in particular.

Horse racing
Events
 c.1750 — Formation of the Jockey Club to establish rules for British racing.

References

Sources
 
 
 
 
 

1741